HMS Janus, named after the Roman god, was a Javelin or J-class destroyer of the Royal Navy. She was ordered from the Swan Hunter & Wigham Richardson Limited at Wallsend-on-Tyne as part of the 1936 Build Programme and laid down on 29 September 1937, launched on 10 November 1938 and commissioned on 5 August 1939.

Service history

North Sea and Mediterranean duties
Off Namsos, Norway, on 30 April 1940 the sloop  was mistaken for a cruiser and was badly damaged by German Junkers Ju 87 dive bombers and had to be sunk by Janus. Janus served in the North Sea until May 1940 and had participated in over 20 convoy duties in that time. From May 1940 Janus began Mediterranean duties with the 14th Destroyer Flotilla in Alexandria. She participated in the Battle of Calabria in July 1940 and the Battle of Cape Matapan in March 1941, and in the action off Sfax in April 1941.

Fate
On 23 January 1944 Janus was struck by one Fritz X guided bomb dropped by a German He 111 torpedo bomber and sank off the Anzio beachhead in western Italy (according to another version, she was sunk by Henschel Hs 293 glider bomb or a conventional torpedo – see Fritz X article). It took a mere twenty minutes for Janus to sink. It was recorded that during her last duty Janus had laid down nearly 500 salvos of 4.7-inch shells in the first two days of the landings in support of allied troops.

Januss badge is still on display at the Selborne dry dock wall.

Notes

References
 
 
 
 
 
 
 
 
 
 

 

J, K and N-class destroyers of the Royal Navy
Ships built by Swan Hunter
Ships built on the River Tyne
1938 ships
World War II destroyers of the United Kingdom
World War II shipwrecks in the Mediterranean Sea
Destroyers sunk by aircraft
Maritime incidents in January 1944
Ships sunk by German aircraft
Naval magazine explosions